Vladimir Koev (born 31 August 1979) is a Bulgarian road racing cyclist.

Doping
In June 2006, he tested positive for stanozolol and was suspended for two years. In 2010, he tested positive again, this time for heptaminol. After this, Koev was given an eight-year suspension. All of his results for 2010 and 2011 were stripped. He then served an eight years suspension from June 2010 to June 2018 after testing positive for heptaminol.

Major results

2001
2nd Road race, National Road Championships
2004
1st Overall Tour of Romania
3rd Grand Prix de la ville de Nogent-sur-Oise
2006
2nd Overall Tour of Greece
1st Stage 5
2nd Overall Paths of King Nikola
3rd Time trial, National Road Championships
5th Overall GP Cycliste de Gemenc
10th Overall Presidential Cycling Tour of Turkey
2009
1st  Time trial, Balkan Road Championships
2nd Overall Tour of Romania
2nd Road race, National Road Championships
2nd Overall Tour of Bulgaria
3rd Tour of Vojvodina II
 7th Overall Tour of Szeklerland
1st Stage 3a
7th Tour of Vojvodina I
2010
1st Overall Paths of King Nikola
1st Stage 1
2nd GP Kranj

References

External links

1979 births
Living people
Bulgarian male cyclists
Doping cases in cycling
People from Kazanlak